Eliminator may refer to:

People and characters
The Eliminators (band), a band which covered "The Saint" from Surfbeat Behind the Iron Curtain, Volume 1
The Eliminators, a professional wrestling tag team that consisted of John Kronus and Perry Saturn
The Eliminator, a ring name of professional wrestler John Kronus
Eli the Eliminator, a ring name of professional wrestler John Richmond

Fictional characters
X the Eliminator, a fictional animated character created by Hanna-Barbera from Harvey Birdman: Attorney at Law and  Birdman and the Galaxy Trio

Film and television
Eliminators (1986 film), a science fiction film
Eliminators (2016 film), an action/thriller film
Eliminator (game show), a CITV children's show presented by Michael Underwood
"The Eliminator", an episode of the DIC cartoon G.I. Joe: A Real American Hero
The Eliminator (film), a 2004 action film

Music
Eliminator (album), a 1983 studio album by ZZ Top
"The Eliminators" (song), a 1990 song off the Mickey Hart album At the Edge

Sports and games
The Eliminator (American Gladiators), an event from the television series American Gladiators

Videogames
Eliminator (1988 video game), a 3D-shooter video game for 16-bit home computers
Eliminator (1981 video game), a multi-directional shooter space combat video game
The Eliminator (video game), a 1981 game for the TRS-80
Juiced: Eliminator, a 2006 video game

Transport
Kawasaki Eliminator, a line of cruiser-style motorcycles
Eliminator (funny car), a series of Funny Cars driven by Don Nicholson
The Eliminator (ZZ Top), a custom car built for ZZ Top

Fictional
Eliminator (G.I. Joe), a fictional vehicle from the G.I. Joe Battleforce 2000 toy line

See also
 
 
 

 Mr. Eliminator (album), 1964 album by Dale and the Del-Tones
 "Mr. Eliminator" (song), a 1964 song by Dale and the Del-Tones off the eponymous album Mr. Eliminator
 "Eliminator Jr." (song), a 1989 song by Sonic Youth off the album Daydream Nation
 X, the Eliminator ("Birdman" episode), a 2003 season 1 number 9 episode of Harvey Birdman, Attorney at Law
 Elimination (disambiguation)